Jerzy Jan Woźniak (27 December 1932 – 9 January 2011) was a Polish footballer who played at both professional and international levels. Wozniak spent 13 seasons at Legia Warsaw, and also earned 35 caps for the Polish national team. He was also part of Poland's squad at the 1960 Summer Olympics.

References

1932 births
2011 deaths
Polish footballers
Poland international footballers
Footballers from Warsaw
Association football defenders
Olympic footballers of Poland
Footballers at the 1960 Summer Olympics